Brown County High School, or BCHS, is a public four-year high school located at 500 East Main Street in Mount Sterling, Illinois, a small city in Brown County, Illinois, in the Midwestern United States. BCHS serves the communities of Mount Sterling, Ripley, Timewell, and Versailles.

Academics

Athletics

Brown County High School competes in the Western Illinois Valley Conference and is a member school in the Illinois High School Association. Their mascot is the Hornets, with school colors of kelly green, white, and gold. The school has no state championships on record in team athletics and activities.

History

Brown County High School was formed out of Mount Sterling High School in 19??. Surrounding communities may have also possessed high schools at some time which were consolidated into the current BCHS. Potential reference/citation:

References

External links
 Brown County High School
 Brown County Community Unit School District

Public high schools in Illinois
Schools in Brown County, Illinois